Scotophaeus is a genus of ground spiders that was first described by Eugène Simon in 1893.

Species
 it contains sixty-two species and two subspecies:
S. aculeatus Simon, 1914 – France
S. affinis Caporiacco, 1949 – Kenya
S. afghanicus Roewer, 1961 – Afghanistan
S. arboricola Jézéquel, 1965 – Ivory Coast
S. bersebaensis Strand, 1915 – Namibia
S. bharatae Gajbe, 1989 – India
S. bifidus Schmidt & Krause, 1994 – Cape Verde Is.
S. blackwalli (Thorell, 1871) – Europe, Caucasus. Introduced to North America, Peru, Hawaii
Scotophaeus b. isabellinus (Simon, 1873) – France (Corsica), Italy, Croatia, USA & Canada (Cosmopolitan)
Scotophaeus b. politus (Simon, 1878) – France
S. brolemanni Simon, 1914 – France
S. cecileae Barrion & Litsinger, 1995 – Philippines
S. correntinus Mello-Leitão, 1945 – Argentina
S. crinitus Jézéquel, 1965 – Ivory Coast
S. dispulsus (O. Pickard-Cambridge, 1885) – Tajikistan, Mongolia
S. dolanskyi Lissner, 2017 – Portugal
S. domesticus Tikader, 1962 – India
S. fabrisae Caporiacco, 1950 – Italy
S. faisalabadiensis Ghafoor & Beg, 2002 – Pakistan
S. gridellii Caporiacco, 1928 – Canary Is.
S. hierro Schmidt, 1977 – Canary Is.
S. hunan Zhang, Song & Zhu, 2003 – China, Japan
S. insularis Berland, 1936 – Cape Verde Is., Greece
S. invisus (O. Pickard-Cambridge, 1885) – China (Yarkand)
S. jacksoni Berland, 1936 – Cape Verde Is.
S. jinlin Song, Zhu & Zhang, 2004 – China
S. kalimpongensis Gajbe, 1992 – India
S. lamperti Strand, 1906 – Central Africa
S. lindbergi Roewer, 1961 – Afghanistan
S. madalasae Tikader & Gajbe, 1977 – India
S. marleyi Tucker, 1923 – South Africa
S. mauckneri Schmidt, 1956 – Canary Is.
S. merkaricola Strand, 1907 – India
S. meruensis Tullgren, 1910 – East Africa
S. microdon Caporiacco, 1933 – Libya
S. musculus (Simon, 1878) – Salvages, Madeira, France
S. nanoides Wunderlich, 2011 – Portugal
S. nanus Wunderlich, 1995 – Austria
S. natalensis Lawrence, 1938 – South Africa
S. nigrosegmentatus (Simon, 1895) – Mongolia, Karakorum
S. nossibeensis Strand, 1907 – Madagascar
S. nyrensis Simon, 1909 – East Africa
S. parvioculis Strand, 1906 – Ethiopia
S. peninsularis Roewer, 1928 – Greece (incl. Crete), Israel
S. poonaensis Tikader, 1982 – India
S. pretiosus (L. Koch, 1873) – New Zealand
S. purcelli Tucker, 1923 – South Africa
S. quadripunctatus (Linnaeus, 1758) (type) – Europe, Turkey, Caucasus
S. rajasthanus Tikader, 1966 – India
S. rebellatus (Simon, 1880) – China
S. regularis Tullgren, 1910 – East Africa
S. relegatus Purcell, 1907 – Namibia, South Africa
S. retusus (Simon, 1878) – France
S. rufescens (Kroneberg, 1875) – Central Asia
S. schenkeli Caporiacco, 1949 – Kenya
S. scutulatus (L. Koch, 1866) – Europe, Algeria, Turkey, Caucasus, Russia (Europe to South Siberia), Central Asia
S. semitectus (Simon, 1886) – Senegal
S. simlaensis Tikader, 1982 – India, China
S. strandi Caporiacco, 1940 – Ethiopia
S. tubicola Schmidt, 1990 – Canary Is.
S. typhlus Schmidt & Piepho, 1994 – Cape Verde Is.
S. validus (Lucas, 1846) – Southern Europe, Morocco, Algeria
S. westringi Simon, 1914 – France
S. xizang Zhang, Song & Zhu, 2003 – China

References

Araneomorphae genera
Gnaphosidae
Spiders of Africa
Spiders of Asia
Taxa named by Eugène Simon